The 1986–87 All-Ireland Senior Club Hurling Championship was the 17th staging of the All-Ireland Senior Club Hurling Championship, an inter-county knockout competition for Ireland's top championship clubs representing each county.  The championship was won by Borrisoleigh of Tipperary, who beat Rathnure of Wexford by 2–9 to 0–9 in the final.

Results

Connacht Senior Club Hurling Championship

Second round

Semi-final

Final

Leinster Senior Club Hurling Championship

Preliminary round

First round

Quarter-finals

Semi-finals

Final

Munster Senior Club Hurling Championship

Quarter-finals

Semi-finals

Final

Ulster Senior Hurling Championship

Final

All-Ireland Senior Hurling Championship

Quarter-final

Semi-finals

Final

References

1986 in hurling
1987 in hurling
All-Ireland Senior Club Hurling Championship